Azaborane usually refers a borane cluster where BH vertices are replaced by N or NR (R = H, organic substituent).  Like many of the related boranes, these clusters are polyhedra and can be classified as closo-, nido-, arachno-, etc.

Within the context of Wade's rules, NR is a 4-electron vertex, and N is a 3-electron vertex.  Prominent examples are the charge-neutral nido-NB10H13 (i.e. (NH)(BH)10) and closo-NB11H12 (i.e. (NH)(BH)11).

Azaboranes can also refer to simpler compounds including iminoboranes (formula = RN=NR') and borazines.

See also 
 Carborane

References

Boron–nitrogen compounds
Cluster chemistry
Boranes